George Servinis (born April 29, 1962) is a Canadian  former professional ice hockey player who played five games in the National Hockey League (NHL) with the Minnesota North Stars during the 1987–88 season. The rest of his career, which lasted from 1985 to 1989, was spent in the minor leagues and followed by one season in the Austrian Hockey League.

Career statistics

Regular season and playoffs

Awards and honors

References

External links
 

1962 births
Living people
Canadian ice hockey left wingers
EC VSV players
Indianapolis Checkers players
Kalamazoo Wings (1974–2000) players
Minnesota North Stars players
NCAA men's ice hockey national champions
RPI Engineers men's ice hockey players
Ice hockey people from Toronto
Springfield Indians players
Undrafted National Hockey League players